The 2007 Gent–Wevelgem cycling race took place on 11 April 2007. The race had a length of 207 km.

The day began in Deinze with overcast weather and light winds.  This gave way to a quick start and it was not until after the first intermediate sprint that the initial break of Florent Brard, Christophe Mengin, and Roger Hammond.  The leaders were allowed a substantial lead (eleven minutes) for a semi-classic, which forced the peloton ride aggressively over the final 100 km.

During the descents of the Kemmelberg, several riders crashed on the wet cobblestones and were severely injured after a rider swerved to avoid a fallen water bottle.  Amongst them were Jimmy Casper (broken nose, broken collarbone, broken wrist), Wim De Vocht (broken thumb), James Vanlandschoot (broken thumb, wrist and elbow), Andy Cappelle (broken elbow and fractured shoulder), Marco Velo (broke his knee, collarbone and 2 ribs), Wilfried Cretskens (several contusions), Aart Vierhouten, Tyler Farrar, Luke Roberts, Fabio Sacchi, Mathew Hayman, Matthew Wilson and Heinrich Haussler.  This caused splits in the peloton and an elite group of riders were left to chase down the lead trio.

Eventually Marcus Burghardt, Francisco Ventoso, and Óscar Freire joined the leaders with roughly 25 km to go.  The six managed to hold off the remaining peloton and, with less than 1 km to go, Burghardt caught Freire by surprise and made the winning move.  Burghardt's teammate, Hammond, managed to catch hold of Freire's wheel and overtook the Spaniard in the sprint for a  one-two finish.

General Standings 
2007-04-11, Gent–Wevelgem,

References

External links
Race website
2007 Gent-Wevelgem on cyclingnews.com

2007
2007 UCI ProTour
2007 in Belgian sport